Yaman Candar - or Jandar, full name Temur Şemseddin (Shamsaddin) Yaman Candar  was the founder and first Bey of Candarid beylik (principality) in Anatolia in the late 13th century.

Early life
There is no record of his family except that he was of Turkoman origin. According to Islam Encyclopedia his name Candar was also the title of palace guards and Yaman Candar was probably a candar in Seljuks palace

His activities in the civil war
In 1291 Ilkhanid emperor Arghun, the suzerain of the Seljuks died. During the chaos following his death, Seljukid prince Kılıç Arslan (son of Kaykaus II who was living in Crimea), came to Anatolia to wrest for the Seljuk throne in 1292. His main ally was the Chobanids. Sultan Mesut II who was Kılıç Arslan's elder brother tried to chase him. But Kılıç Arslan and Yavlak Arslan of Chobanids defeated Mesut in the clash and he was taken prisoner. However, Yaman Candar in a surprise attack defeated the allies. Mesut was  liberated and Yavlak Arslan was killed.

As a Bey
Gaykhatu the new Ilkhanid Emperor was pleased with Yaman Candar and he gave Kastamonu (in the Black Sea region of Turkey, formerly a Chobanid possession) to Yaman Candar as iqta. There is no record of Yaman Candar's later life. He probably died in the early 14th century.

Aftermath
Although the Chobanids captured Kastamonu following Yaman Candar's death, his son Süleyman later ended the Chobanid Beylik which continued till 1461.

References

Isfendiyarids
History of Kastamonu
13th-century births
Turkic rulers
Anatolian beyliks
13th-century monarchs in Asia